Park View Office Tower  is a 16-floor office building located near Park Panfilov on Kunayev Street in Almaty, Kazakhstan. It is considered the first green building in Central Asia. The building has a canteen, food court, restaurant, cafeteria facilities, a hi-tech meeting conference room, and free Wi-Fi.

References

Buildings and structures in Almaty
Skyscrapers in Almaty
Office buildings completed in 2010
Office buildings in Kazakhstan
Office buildings in Almaty
Skyscraper office buildings